Julia's on Broadway, or simply Julia's, is a restaurant in Seattle's Capitol Hill, in the United States. The restaurant hosts the drag show Le Faux. During the COVID-19 pandemic, Julia's closed temporarily. Some of the show's participants streamed performances online. Julia's has also hosted Jinkx Monsoon and Irene Dubois.

References

External links

 
 

Capitol Hill, Seattle
LGBT culture in Seattle
Restaurants in Seattle